Ummern is a municipality in the district of Gifhorn, in Lower Saxony, Germany. The Municipality Ummern includes the villages of Pollhöfen and Ummern.

The airfield Ummern is located about 3 km north of the village.

References

Gifhorn (district)